Abdul Rashid Moten (born February 20, 1947) is a Bangladeshi Muslim political scientist, academic, and author on issues ranging from political science and its various aspects, Islamic methodology in political science, political movements in the Muslim world, and good governance from the Islamic perspective. According to Worldcat, he is the author of 42 works in 81 publications in 3 languages. His book Political Science: An Islamic Perspective is held by nearly 300 libraries.

Biography
After completing his B.A. and M.A. in political science from the University of Dhaka, Moten completed a second M.A., in political theory, from Villanova University in the U.S., and his Ph.D. from the University of Alberta in Canada.

Moten started his career in 1972 at Chittagong University, Bangladesh. In 1976, he joined the University of Alberta as a lecturer of the Department of Political Science, followed by Bayero University in the Department of Political Science (1978–92).  He finally joined International Islamic University Malaysia (1992–present), where he later became Professor in the Department of Political Science.

Moten was the editor of the journal Intellectual Discourse from 2001 to 2008, and is presently the editor of the journal International Journal of Islamic Thoughts (IJITs).

Publications
He has written and edited numerous books and published a large number of academic articles. A list of books by the author include:

References

External links
 Staff page at International Islamic University Malaysia

Bangladeshi political scientists
1947 births
Living people
University of Dhaka alumni
Academic staff of the International Islamic University Malaysia